Jeanette McLenaghan (born September 8, 1983 as Jeanette Murphy) is a Canadian curler from Quispamsis, New Brunswick.

Career
Murphy curled at the Canadian Junior Curling Championships in 2003 with her longtime teammate Rebecca Atkinson. She also curled at the Scotties Tournament of Hearts in 2007 & 2012.

Personal life
Murphy is the sister of six time Nova Scotia champion curler, Jamie Murphy. She got married in 2014 and had three kids in 2016.

References

External links
 

1983 births
Curlers from New Brunswick
Canadian women curlers
People from Kings County, New Brunswick
Living people
Sportspeople from Fredericton